Félix Antonio Díaz (born July 27, 1980) is a former pitcher in Major League Baseball who played for the Chicago White Sox in the  season. Díaz bats and throws right-handed.

Career
In one major league season, Díaz posted a 2–5 record with 33 strikeouts and a 6.75 ERA in 18 games pitched (seven as a starter).

In November 2006, Díaz signed with the Washington Nationals a minor league deal. In late July , he was released and a few days later signed a minor league contract with the Boston Red Sox. He signed with the Kia Tigers in 2008. In 2010, Diaz played for the Tecolotes de Nuevo Laredo of the Mexican League.

External links

1980 births
Living people
Arizona League Giants players
Birmingham Barons players
Broncos de Reynosa players
Charlotte Knights players
Chicago White Sox players
Columbus Clippers players
Diablos Rojos del México players
Dominican Republic expatriate baseball players in Japan
Dominican Republic expatriate baseball players in Mexico
Dominican Republic expatriate baseball players in South Korea
Dominican Republic expatriate baseball players in the United States
Hagerstown Suns players
Hokkaido Nippon-Ham Fighters players
KBO League pitchers
Kia Tigers players

Major League Baseball pitchers
Major League Baseball players from the Dominican Republic
Mexican League baseball pitchers
Nippon Professional Baseball pitchers
People from San Juan Province (Dominican Republic)
Portland Sea Dogs players
Rieleros de Aguascalientes players
Salem-Keizer Volcanoes players
Saraperos de Saltillo players
Shreveport Swamp Dragons players
Tecolotes de Nuevo Laredo players
Estrellas Orientales players
Tigres del Licey players
Leones del Escogido players
Gigantes de Carolina players
Dominican Republic expatriate baseball players in Puerto Rico